Hans Ewald Hansen (born 15 February 1944) is a Danish footballer. He competed in the men's tournament at the 1972 Summer Olympics.

References

External links
 

1944 births
Living people
Danish men's footballers
Denmark international footballers
Olympic footballers of Denmark
Footballers at the 1972 Summer Olympics
People from Guldborgsund Municipality
Association football midfielders
Sportspeople from Region Zealand